State highways in the U.S. state of West Virginia are owned and maintained by the West Virginia Division of Highways.

History

State routes

Special routes

See also

References

External links
 

  
State highways